This is a list of universities and seminaries where Pope Benedict XVI studied or taught.

Studies

Saint Michael Seminary in Traunstein
College of Freising (Philosophisch-Theologische Hochschule Freising) (1946-1951)
Ludwig Maximilian University of Munich (seminarian at the Ducal Georgianum until 1951, doctoral thesis 1953, Habilitation 1958)

As a faculty member
College of Freising (professor 1958-1959)
University of Bonn (professor 1959-1963)
University of Münster (professor 1963-1966)
Eberhard Karls University of Tübingen (professor 1966-1969)
University of Regensburg (professor 1969-1977, since 1977 listed as an honorary professor)

References

Pope Benedict XVI